Yondr is an American company founded by Graham Dugoni in 2014. It makes mobile phone pouches which close with a magnetic lock, similar to those of a retail security tag, and a device for unlocking them.

Yondr products can be used at private events to lock up a mobile phone or similar device while inside. People entering are required to lock their device inside a Yondr pouch, taking the pouch with them. This is intended to deter audio and video recording, photography, or the distractions of using a mobile device. It has been used at music concerts, theatrical performances, courts, schools and nightclubs.

Yondr also leases its products to schools, sparking backlash from the students.

History
Graham Dugoni, a former professional soccer player, founded Yondr after attending the Treasure Island Music Festival in 2012. After witnessing an intoxicated man dancing and people filming him, he pondered how this could affect freedom of expression. After raising $100,000 from friends and family, the company became profitable and he started consulting with his local hardware store as well as a seamstress. He would later visit schools in San Francisco.

See also
Mobile phone jammer
Mobile phone use in schools
Secret photography

References

External links

Manufacturing companies based in the San Francisco Bay Area
American companies established in 2014
2014 establishments in California
Smartphones
Mobile phone culture